Hunter Steward (born December 23, 1991) is a Canadian football offensive lineman for the Ottawa Redblacks of the Canadian Football League (CFL).

College career
Steward played college football with the Liberty Flames.

Professional career

BC Lions
Steward was selected in the first round and sixth overall by the BC Lions in the 2013 CFL Draft. After completing his college eligibility, Steward signed with the team on March 25, 2014. It was announced on January 30, 2020, that Steward had signed a two-year extension to remain with the Lions. He became a free agent upon the expiry of his contract on February 8, 2022.

Ottawa Redblacks
On February 8, 2022, it was announced that Steward had signed with the Ottawa Redblacks.

References

External links
Ottawa Redblacks profile
 
 

1991 births
Living people
BC Lions players
Canadian football offensive linemen
Liberty Flames football players
Ottawa Redblacks players
Players of Canadian football from Alberta
Canadian football people from Calgary